The 1982 Northwestern Wildcats team represented Northwestern University during the 1982 Big Ten Conference football season. In their second year under head coach Dennis Green, the Wildcats compiled a 3–8 record (2–7 against Big Ten Conference opponents) and finished in a tie for eighth place in the Big Ten Conference.

On September 25, Northwestern defeated Northern Illinois 31–6 to end the Wildcats' 34-game losing streak, which remains the longest losing streak in FBS/1-A history.

Dennis Green was awarded Big Ten Coach of the Year for the 1982 season. While the team's record is still the worst of any winner's team, their three wins equaled the team's total over the past six seasons.

The team's offensive leaders were quarterback Sandy Schwab with 2,735 passing yards, Ricky Edwards with 688 rushing yards, and Jon Harvey with 807 receiving yards. Offensive tackle Chris Hinton received first-team All-Big Ten honors from both the Associated Press and the United Press International.

Schedule

Personnel

References

Northwestern
Northwestern Wildcats football seasons
Northwestern Wildcats football